John Handley (December 1807 – 8 December 1869) was a Liberal Party politician in England.

At the 1857 general election he was elected as a Member of Parliament (MP) for the borough of Newark in Nottinghamshire. He was re-elected in 1859, and stood down from the House of Commons at the 1865 general election.

References

External links 
 

1807 births
1869 deaths
Liberal Party (UK) MPs for English constituencies
UK MPs 1857–1859
UK MPs 1859–1865